Monty Gene Beisel (born August 20, 1978) is a former American football linebacker. He was drafted by the Kansas City Chiefs in the fourth round of the 2001 NFL Draft. He played college football at Kansas State.

Beisel also played for the New England Patriots and Arizona Cardinals.

High school career
Born in Victoria, Kansas, Beisel graduated from Douglass High School in Douglass, Kansas in 1997. Beisel was a Parade All-America selection  and honorable mention All-USA pick by USA Today in 1996.

College career
Beisel attended college at Kansas State University as a Social Sciences/Mass Communications major.  Beisel also played in 44 games accumulating 192 tackles (110 solo), 22.0 sacks, 45.0 stops for loss and 18 passes defended. He was a two-time first-team Academic All-Big 12 selection.  He also received All-Big 12 Conference honorable mention and was a second-team Academic All-Big 12 pick.

Professional career

Arizona Cardinals
In Week 6 of the 2008 season, against the Dallas Cowboys, Beisel became the first player in NFL history to score a game-winning touchdown in overtime by returning a blocked punt.

Second stint with Chiefs
He re-signed with the Chiefs during the 2009 off-season. He was released on September 29.

Second stint with Cardinals
Beisel was re-signed by Arizona on November 24, 2009.  He was released September 3, 2010.

References

External links
Kansas City Chiefs bio

1978 births
Living people
People from Victoria, Kansas
Players of American football from Kansas
American football linebackers
Kansas State Wildcats football players
Kansas City Chiefs players
New England Patriots players
Arizona Cardinals players
People from Douglass, Kansas